Germany–North Korea relations are the bilateral relations between Germany and the Democratic People's Republic of Korea (DPRK), commonly known as North Korea. During the Cold War, East Germany maintained diplomatic relations only with North Korea, while West Germany maintained diplomatic relations only with South Korea. East Germany ceased to exist upon German reunification, which meant that diplomatic relations no longer existed between Germany and North Korea. The two countries appointed protecting powers to represent their interests in the other country, Sweden being the protecting power for Germany, and China being the protecting power for North Korea.

Germany and North Korea established diplomatic relations with each other in 2001. The German embassy in Pyongyang remains in the old East German embassy compound, which is now shared with the Swedish and British embassies.

Since the establishment of diplomatic relations, there have been no visits of government delegations at ministerial level to Germany or North Korea. However, there have been several official visits to North Korea by members of the German Bundestag.

According to a 2013 BBC World Service Poll, only 3% of Germans view North Korea's influence positively, with 90% expressing a negative view, one of the most negative perceptions of North Korea in the world.

History

After the second world war, Korea was split into two parts: North and South Korea. North Korea under Kim Il-sung established during the Cold War diplomatic relationship with former East Germany (GDR), right after the foundation of the Democratic People's Republic of Korea on 9 September 1948.

East Germany sought connections for trade, educational exchange and manifestations as a communist power with the Asian country. After the former USSR and the People's Republic of China, East Germany was the third biggest provider of money to North Korea to fight capitalism. This was done in the communist way of thinking it was clear to help loyal friends in any ways which can be imagined. Kim Il-sung also enjoyed a close personal relationship with East German First Secretary Erich Honecker. Honecker visited Pyongyang in 1977, while Kim reciprocated by visiting East Berlin in 1980.

From 1955 to 1962, the East German government ran a large-scale programme to reconstruct the port cities of Hamhung and Hungnam which had been severely damaged 
by US air raids during the Korean War (1950–53). Called the Deutsche Arbeitsgruppe (DAG), the team consisted of city planners, architects, technical personnel and craftsmen, who built residential and industrial areas, hospitals, schools, hotels, a concert hall, and an outdoor swimming pool. The work was funded by the East German government and donations from East German citizens. The first Head of City Planning for the Hamhŭng project was the Bauhaus trained architect Konrad Püschel.

After the Sino-Soviet split in 1960, North Korea was loyal to the PRC's Mao, but East Germany grew closer with the Soviet Union. Because of that the once growing close relationship stagnated. For example, North Korean exchange students who studied at universities in East Germany had to go back to North Korea in 1962. Some North Korean students were engaged or married with some East German students or other young woman and already had children with them, even if these relationships were prohibited. After the separation of the more or less forbidden lovers, the children stayed with their mothers in Germany and grew up in East Germany, whilst their fathers had to go back to North Korea. The majority of these Germans never saw their father, husband or lover again. The German-Korean director Cho Sung-hyung made a film about German-Korean families in 2015. In 1991, North Korea offered former East German leader Erich Honecker asylum in the country after Honecker sought to escape charges of ordering the killing of escapees from East Germany prior to the fall of the Berlin Wall in November 1989.

After the collapse of the Soviet Union, the East German Embassy was closed until after German reunification. The former North Korean Embassy in East Berlin was turned into an Office for the Protection of the Interests of the Democratic People’s Republic of Korea, with the People's Republic of China acting as protecting power. The reunified Germany and North Korea established diplomatic relations on 1 March 2001.

German embassy in Pyongyang 
In 2001, the German Embassy in Pyongyang was reestablished and Germany tried to bring North Korea to the six-party talks to discuss about the problem of the North Korean nuclear weapons program. Due to nuclear tests in January, February and September 2016, Germany imposed sanctions, and followed the UN and European Union. This led to a  deterioration of the bilateral relations between both countries, which means no more shipping of luxury goods from Germany to North Korea as well as an arms embargo. A complete prohibition of foreign trade and other sanctions could influence the expansion of further nuclear tests.

But before the harsh international answer to the forbidden tests of missiles and nuclear weapons in North Korea, Germany was seeking a peaceful exchange with providing education on terms of scholarships for Korean students or bringing the German language to Korea. Therefore, Germany provides a position for a German lecturer with help from the German Academic Exchange Service at the Kim Il-sung University. Already in the eighties, two lecturers were at the university to teach German, and close relations existed with the section of the Korean Studies at the Humboldt University in East Berlin. Since then a lot of North Koreans could visit Germany and profit from the cultural exchange.

One reason was because of the Sunshine Policy of the former South Korean president Kim Dae-jung, a new and better diplomatic relationship with North Korea and few EU members were possible so that Germany as a cultural nation could set projects with for example the Goethe-Institut. Because of UN-sanctions  Germany can recently not host North Korean researchers for example engineers or scientists.

As German diplomats are not allowed to have an account in North Korea, they have to get everything from China, including cash and even their food.

North Korean embassy in Berlin 

After the readmission of the diplomatic bilateral relations between North Korea and Germany, like Germany did in Pyongyang, North Korea also moved back to their old embassy building in Berlin which they used at the time when Germany was still divided. The former ambassador of North Korea, Hong Chang-il, was replaced by the current ambassador Hong Ri-si in 2011.

The once entirely occupied building for the North Korean representatives is only partly used for the embassy. The official building moved to the Glinkastrasse 5–7 in Berlin, so the other parts of this building nowadays are used among other things as a hostel for tourists. Germany threatened to shut down the hostel, in order to curb Pyongyang's nuclear weapons capability in May 2017.

References

 
North
Bilateral relations of North Korea
North Korea